Prof. Gurdip Singh was the vice-chancellor of Dr. Ram Manohar Lohiya National Law University in Lucknow, India. He was also a professor at the University of Delhi, where he had studied as well.

References

Year of birth missing (living people)
Living people
Indian legal scholars
Heads of universities and colleges in India